Guildford Railway Station is a Transperth station 12.5 km from Perth railway station, in Western Australia, on the Midland Line.

History
The station opened in 1881 as the terminus of the original Eastern Railway from Fremantle. In the mid-1880s a second station was built, and a third in 1898. In 1960 the main station was demolished for a carpark, but the 1898 shelter and platform still remain.

Rail services
Guildford railway station is served by the Midland railway line on the Transperth network. This line goes between Midland railway station and Perth railway station. Midland line trains stop at the station every 10 minutes during peak on weekdays, and every 15 minutes during the day outside peak every day of the year except Christmas Day. Trains are half-hourly or hourly at night time. The station saw 173,974 passengers in the 2013-14 financial year.

Bus routes

References

Railway stations in Perth, Western Australia
Midland line, Perth
Guildford, Western Australia
Railway stations in Australia opened in 1881
State Register of Heritage Places in the City of Swan